The 1988 Copa Libertadores de América Finals was the final two-legged tie to determine the 1988 Copa Libertadores champion. It was contested by Uruguayan club Nacional and Argentine club Newell's Old Boys. The first leg of the tie was played on 19 October at Estadio Gigante de Arroyito of Rosario, with the second leg played on 26 October at Estadio Centenario of Montevideo.

Nacional won the series 3–1 on aggregate, achieving their third Copa Libertadores trophy.

Format
The finals were played over two legs; home and away. The team that accumulated the most points —two for a win, one for a draw, zero for a loss— after the two legs was crowned champion. If the two teams had tied on points after the second leg, a playoff in a neutral venue would have become the next tie-breaker. Goal difference was used as a last resort.

Qualified teams

Venues

Match details

First leg

Second leg

References

l
l
1
l
l
Football in Buenos Aires